The 1953 UCI Track Cycling World Championships were the World Championship for track cycling. They took place in Zürich, Switzerland from 21 to 26 August 1953. Five events for men were contested, 3 for professionals and 2 for amateurs.

Medal summary

Medal table

See also
 1953 UCI Road World Championships

References

Track cycling
UCI Track Cycling World Championships by year
International cycle races hosted by Switzerland
Sport in Zürich
1953 in track cycling
20th century in Zürich